The law enforcement in Vietnam is called the Vietnam People's Public Security. It is under command of the Ministry of Public Security.

Vietnam People's Public Security is a part of Vietnam People's Armed Forces, it includes two branches:
 Vietnam People's Police
 Vietnam People's Security Force

External links 

 Website of The Vietnam People's Police (In Vietnamese)